Lehakat Shiru (Hebrew: להקת שירו, lit. "Shiru Group") was the Israeli band that represented Israel in the Eurovision Song Contest 1993 held in Millstreet, Ireland. They performed the song "Shiru". They finished in 24th place with a total of 4 points. The group consisted of Sarah'le Sharon, Benny Nadler, Guy Bracha, Julia Proiter and Rachel Haim. They were accompanied on stage by a backing singer, Varda Zamir.

References and external links 

  Information and photos from the band.

Israeli pop music groups
Eurovision Song Contest entrants of 1993
Eurovision Song Contest entrants for Israel